The 1966 Vermont gubernatorial election took place on November 8, 1966. Incumbent Democrat Philip H. Hoff ran successfully for re-election to a third term as Governor of Vermont, defeating Republican candidate Richard A. Snelling.

Democratic primary

Results

Republican primary

Results

General election

Results

References

Vermont
1966
Gubernatorial
November 1966 events in the United States